In mathematics, a Sobolev mapping is a mapping between manifolds which has smoothness in some sense. 
Sobolev mappings appear naturally in manifold-constrained problems in the calculus of variations and partial differential equations, including the theory of harmonic maps.

Definition 

First-order Sobolev mappings can also be defined in the context of metric spaces.

Approximation 

When , Morrey's inequality implies that Sobolev mappings are continuous and can thus be strongly approximated by smooth maps.
When , Sobolev mappings have vanishing mean oscillation and can thus be approximated by smooth maps.

When , the question of density is related to obstruction theory:

When , this condition is sufficient

Homotopy 

The homotopy problem consists in describing and classifying the path-connected components of the space  endowed with the norm topology.

Extension of traces

The classical trace theory states that any Sobolev map  has a trace  and that when , the trace operator is onto. The proof of the surjectivity being based on an averaging argument, the result does not readily extend to Sobolev mappings.

Lifting

when , when  and 
There is a topological obstruction to the lifting when  and an analytical obstruction when .

References

Further reading 
https://mathoverflow.net/questions/108808/differential-of-a-sobolev-map-between-manifolds

Manifolds
Maps of manifolds
Sobolev spaces
Homotopy theory